Mike Montgomery is an American basketball coach.

Mike or Michael Montgomery may also refer to:

Michael Montgomery (born 1983), American football defensive end
Mike Montgomery (American football) (born 1949), American football running back and wide receiver
Mike Montgomery (baseball) (born 1989), American baseball player
Mike Montgomery (Pretty Little Liars), television character

See also